The 1948 NCAA basketball tournament involved 8 schools playing in single-elimination play to determine the national champion of men's NCAA Division I college basketball. It began on March 19, 1948, and ended with the championship game on March 23 in New York City. A total of 10 games were played, including a third place game in each region and a national third place game.

Kentucky, coached by Adolph Rupp, won the national title with a 58–42 victory in the final game over Baylor, coached by Bill Henderson. Alex Groza of Kentucky was named the tournament's Most Outstanding Player.

Locations
The following are the sites selected to host each round of the 1948 tournament:

Regionals

March 19 and 20
East Regional, Madison Square Garden, New York, New York
West Regional, Municipal Auditorium, Kansas City, Missouri

Championship Game

March 23
Madison Square Garden, New York, New York

Teams

Bracket

Regional third place games

See also
 1948 National Invitation Tournament
 1948 NAIA Basketball Tournament

References

NCAA Division I men's basketball tournament
Tournament
NCAA basketball tournament
NCAA basketball tournament